Mead is an unincorporated community in Raleigh County, West Virginia, United States. Mead had a post office, which closed on June 10, 1989. It was also known as Vanwood.

The community was named after C. H. Mead, the proprietor of a local mine.

Gallery

References

External links

Unincorporated communities in Raleigh County, West Virginia
Unincorporated communities in West Virginia
Coal towns in West Virginia